is the ninth single by Japanese singer Maaya Sakamoto. The lyrics for "Mameshiba" were written by Maaya Sakamoto herself while the lyrics for "Kuuki to Hoshi" were written by Yūho Iwasato. The music was composed and arranged by Yoko Kanno.

"Mameshiba" was used as the ending theme for the anime series Earth Girl Arjuna. The track is included in the first soundtrack album for the anime series. It is also included in Sakamoto's Lucy album.

The single includes the song "Kuuki to Hoshi" which is an extended Japanese version of another song which can be found on the first Earth Girl Arjuna soundtrack album. The soundtrack version is called  (pronounced the same, but using only katakana in the title) and is sung by Chinatsu Yamamoto. The lyrics were written by Gabriela Robin and are in a made-up language.

Track listing
 ("Mameshiba" is a Shiba Inu)

  (instrumental)

Charts

References

2000 singles
2000 songs
Maaya Sakamoto songs
Victor Entertainment singles
Anime songs
Songs with lyrics by Yuho Iwasato
Songs written by Yoko Kanno
Songs written by Maaya Sakamoto